Marty Clarke may refer to:

 Martin Clarke (born 1987), Gaelic and Australian rules footballer
 Marty Clarke (basketball) (born 1967), Australian basketball player and coach